Namibian is something of, from, or related to Namibia, a country in southern Africa on the Atlantic coast.

Namibian may also refer to:
 The Namibian, Namibia's independent daily newspaper

See also 
 Namibian cuisine
 Demographics of Namibia
 Culture of Namibia
 List of Namibians
 Languages of Namibia
 

Language and nationality disambiguation pages